"Hello, Dexter Morgan" is the 11th and penultimate episode of the fourth season of Showtime TV series, Dexter, which aired on December 6, 2009. The police team attempt to get Christine Hill to talk while Dexter frames another man in order to get Arthur Mitchell, the Trinity Killer, all to himself.

Plot
As Angel interrogates Christine, Dexter begins to consider framing someone as a decoy to the police, giving him time to kill Arthur. Meanwhile, Arthur sees a news report on the return of the boy he abducted and realizes that Dexter has not told the police about him. He phones Dexter and asks what he wants; Dexter, improvising, tells him that he wants $50,000 in 24 hours or he will tell the police that Arthur is a pedophile. Arthur takes out a phonebook and researches the various Kyle Butlers of Miami, telling Dexter that he will be in touch.

Debra tries to get Quinn to see that Christine isn't who she told him she was. When Dexter leaves the station, Quinn reacts suspiciously, asking him where he's really going. Captain Matthews confronts LaGuerta and Batista with a video of the two kissing, proving they were lying in their affidavits; he tells them that they have committed perjury and will need to find new jobs. Dexter goes through possible suspect files to decide which one he should frame for Arthur's murders. Meanwhile, Arthur breaks into a house and kills the homeowner, named Kyle Butler. Dexter arrives for an appointment with Rita for marriage counseling, but gets called to a crime scene as soon as he arrives. Rita then confesses that she and Elliot kissed.

Dexter arrives at the scene and learns the victim is a Kyle Butler, causing him to realize that Arthur is after him. Meanwhile, Angel and Debra search Christine's apartment and find a collection of postcards from her father. Dexter goes to another Kyle Butler and renders him unconscious via injection in order to catch Arthur. However, as soon as Arthur arrives, he realizes that the occupant is not Dexter and leaves before Dexter can grab him. Angels shows Christine the postcards, causing her to ask for a lawyer. Quinn realizes that she was using him to get close to the case; Debra tells him not to beat himself up. Dexter arrives at the home of Stan Beaudry and finds that he has taken a trip to Jacksonville. Instead of driving there, he decides to return home and talk with Rita, forgiving her offhandedly for kissing Elliot; for her part, Rita is concerned that Dexter doesn't seem to care that she nearly cheated on him.

Dexter is called into the station and Debra attempts to get Christine to talk. She tells Christine about her own issues with her father, Harry, but Christine reveals nothing. Dexter arrives at the station and acts as witness to LaGuerta and Batista's marriage. He rushes off soon afterwards to kill Stan Beaudry. After a phone call from Mitchell, he catches up with Beaudry and kills him rapidly and plants Arthur's DNA and a picture of Christine in his truck and goes back to his home and plants a hammer there. Dexter returns home and punches Elliot in the face for kissing Rita; she witnesses it and prepares some ice for his hand, telling him that she is glad that he cared. LaGuerta and Batista inform Matthews of their marriage, telling him that a perjury charge wouldn't stand up in court. Christine calls Mitchell to tell him that she's in trouble, and he angrily tells her to never call him again and that he was sorry she had ever been born. Meanwhile, the team finds all the evidence Dexter planted. Debra is informed that Christine wishes to talk to her and she and Quinn rush to Christine's apartment, believing that she wishes to confess. She tells Debra that she shot her and killed Lundy, and asks Debra to forgive her. When Deb refuses, Christine pulls a gun from under a cushion and commits suicide.

After hearing a phone call from Mitchell, Dexter goes to the arcade game area to hunt for him, unaware that Mitchell is in fact following him back to the station. Mitchell infiltrates the station by stealing a visitor's badge and wanders around the station, looking at his work. Debra tells Dexter that she is afraid to erase Lundy's name from the board because then it will all be over. Debra wipes it off after some thought and Dexter goes to his office. To his horror, he sees Mitchell headed toward his office and goes to meet him. Mitchell looks at Dexter's ID badge and says "Hello... Dexter Morgan".

Reception

Critical Reaction
The reception of the episode was generally positive.

IGN gave the episode a "Great" rating of 8.8/10 and said of it that: "We all know that Lithgow's been amazing this season, but I wanted to once again call out Jennifer Carpenter's performance as well. She was given a strong storyline that truly fit with her character's manic energy and she's nailed every scene like a conquering hero. Her hesitance to erase Lundy's name from the case board at the end was great, and so was her realization that focusing on work didn't wind up filling the void in her life; that solving the case didn't bring her any closure. 'I knew finding his killer wouldn't bring him back," Deb lamented. "But I thought it would bring something.' I'd also like to take the time to bring up Courtney Ford's Christine Hill. Let's face it. Ford is fairly flat as an actress, but her best work definitely came in these past two episodes when she had much more difficult scenes to work through. Who knew that she would wind up being worlds better during moments of heartache and anxiety than she would just saying rudimentary lines like 'My name is Christine and I'm a reporter'?"

Awards
"Hello, Dexter Morgan" was nominated for a Primetime Emmy Award for Outstanding Sound Mixing for a Comedy or Drama Series (One Hour). The nominees were James P. Clark, Elmo Ponsdomenech, Kevin Roache, and Jeremy Balko.

References

External links

 

Dexter (TV series) episodes
2009 American television episodes
Television episodes directed by S. J. Clarkson